The Stockholm School of Economics Russia, SSE Russia (Russian Стокгольмская школа экономики России, Swedish: Handelshögskolan i Stockholm Ryssland) is a business school with representation offices in Moscow and St Petersburg. It was founded in 1997 as a subsidiary of the Stockholm School of Economics, with the purpose of supplying the economies of North-eastern Europe in general and Russia in particular with well-educated young professionals.

The majority of the students are Russian nationals studying for Executive MBA-degrees; English is the basic language of instruction. Since 2009 SSE Russia offers an EMBA-program in General Management with simultaneous translation into Russian language.

See also 
List of universities in Russia
 Stockholm School of Economics
Stockholm School of Economics Alumni Association
Stockholm School of Economics in Riga

References

External links 
Stockholm School of Economics
Stockholm School of Economics · Russia
Stockholm School of Economics in Riga

Stockholm School of Economics
Business schools in Russia
Educational institutions established in 1994
1994 establishments in Russia